Maseeha is a Pakistani drama serial directed by Nain Maniar, written by Qaisra Hayaat and produced by Shahzad Nasib and Samina Humayun Saeed It began airing from 8 May 2012 on Hum TV.

Plot
Maseeha revolves around the sacrifices of a young girl who leaves her rich parents to marry her middle-class boyfriend. She does her level best to adjust to his family and takes care of his ill mother and two sisters when he goes abroad, but to no avail. Then a saviour enters her life, or does he?

Cast
 Ayesha Khan as Abish
 Affan Waheed as Shaheryar
 Noman Masood as Basit Ali
 Sukaina Khan as Fiza
 Mariya Khan
 Ayesha Khan as Maira
 Badar Khalil
 Shahood Alvi

References

External links
 Hum TV's official website

Hum TV original programming
Urdu-language television shows
2012 Pakistani television series debuts